Emil Seidler (born 13 March 1914; date of death unknown) was an Austrian ice hockey player who competed for the Austrian national team at the 1936 Winter Olympics in Garmisch-Partenkirchen. He made two appearances at the games. Seidler played club hockey for DSV Leoben.

References

Austrian ice hockey players
Ice hockey players at the 1936 Winter Olympics
Olympic ice hockey players of Austria
1914 births
Year of death missing